Église Notre-Dame-des-Champs de Repentigny is a church located in Repentigny, a suburb of Montreal, Quebec. It was completed in 1963.

External links

References
 
 

Notre-Dame-des-Champs
N
Notre-Dame-des-Champs
Buildings and structures in Lanaudière
20th-century Roman Catholic church buildings in Canada